The Eravallan are Adivasi, a designated Scheduled Tribe in the Indian state of  Kerala. They are an aboriginal tribe whose traditional way of life has been based on hunting and gathering.

Eravallan people believe in Hinduism and speak the Eravallan language.

References

Ethnic groups in India
Scheduled Tribes of India
Indigenous peoples of South Asia